Clare Morrall (born 1952, Exeter) is an English novelist. She has lived mainly in Birmingham, where she worked for many years as a music teacher. Her debut novel, Astonishing Splashes of Colour, was shortlisted for the 2003 Booker Prize. She has subsequently had seven novels published.

Works
 Astonishing Splashes of Colour (2003, Sceptre)
 Natural Flights of the Human Mind (2006, Sceptre)
 The Language of Others (2008, Sceptre)
 The Man Who Disappeared (2010, Sceptre)
 The Roundabout Man (2012, Sceptre)
 After the Bombing  (2014, Sceptre)
 When the Floods Came (2016, Sceptre)
 The Last of the Greenwoods (2018, Sceptre)

External links
 

21st-century English novelists
1952 births
Living people
Writers from Exeter
Alumni of the University of Birmingham